Max Bohland (February 4, 1896 – February 1975) was an American athlete. He competed in the men's individual cross country event at the 1920 Summer Olympics.

References

External links
 

1896 births
1975 deaths
People from Pegau
People from the Kingdom of Saxony
German emigrants to the United States
American male long-distance runners
Olympic track and field athletes of the United States
Athletes (track and field) at the 1920 Summer Olympics
Olympic cross country runners
20th-century American people